is a Japanese professional footballer who plays as a defender for Criacao Shinjuku in the Japan Football League.

Playing career
He joined Thespakusatsu Gunma after being selected for Kanto University selection B, and debuted for Thespakusatsu Gunma against Tochigi SC on 31 March 2013. He transferred to Montedio Yamagata in 2014, then made his competitive debut for the club in a J. League Cup match against Vegalta Sendai.

In 2021, citing the warmth he received from their approach as a human being other than a player, he joined Criacao Shinjuku.

Club statistics
Updated to 23 February 2020.

References

External links
Profile at Renofa Yamaguchi

1990 births
Living people
Kokushikan University alumni
Association football people from Hiroshima Prefecture
Japanese footballers
J1 League players
J2 League players
Japan Football League players
Thespakusatsu Gunma players
Montedio Yamagata players
Renofa Yamaguchi FC players
Tochigi SC players
Criacao Shinjuku players
Association football defenders